Dhrangadhra Junction railway station is a major railway station in Dhrangadhra town of Surendranagar district, Gujarat. It serves Dhrangadhra town. Its code is DHG. DEMU, Passenger, Express, and Superfast trains halt here. Two trains start from here.

Trains

 22955/56 Kutch Express
 12993/94 Gandhidham–Puri Weekly Superfast Express
 18501/02 Visakhapatnam–Gandhidham Express
 19115/16 Sayajinagari Express
 14311/12 Ala Hazrat Express (via Ahmedabad)
 16505/06 Gandhidham–Bangalore City Express
 16335/36 Gandhidham–Nagercoil Express
 11091/92 Bhuj–Pune Express
 22829/30 Shalimar–Bhuj Weekly Superfast Express
 12937/38 Garbha Express
 12473/74 Gandhidham–Shri Mata Vaishno Devi Katra Sarvodaya Express

History

Dhrangadhra Railway was owned by Princely state of Dhrangadhra. It was opened to traffic in 1898.

See also
Dhrangadhra Railway

References

Railway stations in Surendranagar district
Ahmedabad railway division
Railway junction stations in Gujarat
Railway stations in India opened in 1898